Lene Hoberg (born 11 March 1959) is a Danish equestrian. She competed in two events at the 1992 Summer Olympics.

References

1959 births
Living people
Danish female equestrians
Danish dressage riders
Olympic equestrians of Denmark
Equestrians at the 1992 Summer Olympics
Sportspeople from Copenhagen